Messouda or Messaouda  Mint Baham (born 1964 in Mederdra) is a Mauritanian politician. She was Minister of Rural Development in 2008–2009. and was elected to parliament again in 2018, for the Al Islah party. In October 2019, she was elected the first secretary of the National Assembly.

References

External links
 Interview

1964 births
Living people
Government ministers of Mauritania
Women government ministers of Mauritania
Members of the National Assembly (Mauritania)
El Islah politicians
21st-century Mauritanian women politicians
21st-century Mauritanian politicians
People from Trarza Region